Omar Fonstad el Ghaouti (born 15 February 1990) is a Norwegian futsal player and football striker who plays for Hønefoss.

Hailing from Stovner in Oslo, he is of Norwegian and Moroccan descent. After playing for Stabæk U20 he played for four clubs in and around Oslo before making his way to Malta in 2012. A journeyman footballer, he also won 17 caps for the Norwegian national futsal team in 2014 and 2015.

References

1990 births
Living people
Footballers from Oslo
Norwegian people of Moroccan descent
Norwegian footballers
Lørenskog IF players
Sliema Wanderers F.C. players
Żejtun Corinthians F.C. players
Ullensaker/Kisa IL players
Moss FK players
IF Fram Larvik players
Bryne FK players
Arendal Fotball players
Alta IF players
Hønefoss BK players
Norwegian Second Division players
Association football forwards
Norwegian expatriate footballers
Expatriate footballers in Malta
Norwegian expatriate sportspeople in Malta
Norwegian men's futsal players